Henry "Harry" Donnan (12 November 1864 – 13 August 1956) was an Australian cricketer who played in 5 Tests between 1892 and 1896.

Donnan scored the first century in the Sheffield Shield when he made 120 for New South Wales against South Australia in the first Shield match in 1892–93.

Donnan worked for the Colonial Sugar Refining Company for 42 years until he retired in 1923.

See also
 List of New South Wales representative cricketers

References

External links
 
 Harry Donnan at CricketArchive

1864 births
1956 deaths
Australia Test cricketers
New South Wales cricketers
Australian cricketers
Cricketers from Sydney